The 1993–94 Whitbread Round the World Race was the sixth edition of the around-the-world sailing event. 
The race was won by Grant Dalton the maxi 'New Zealand Endeavour'.

As with prior races, the 1993-1994 Whitbread was run to "mixed class" rules. However a new purpose-built Whitbread boat—the W60 was introduced.  As with previous years a handicap was applied to different boats based on their race rating. Some W60 competitors were not keen on running both Maxis and W60s together once it became evident some of the old Maxis were only as fast as the W60 class. Some W60 competitors wished to ban Maxis, however this was never realistic given the large investments the Maxi owners had made in the expectation of being able to race. There were also concerns over whether enough new W60 boats would be ready.

Despite the closeness of the finishes, some W60 skippers claimed to be in a 'completely different boat race' to Grant Dalton skippering a maxi.

Participants

Intrum Justitia was originally skippered by Roger Nilson, who was injured on the first leg.

Winston (yacht)

Winston (also Nilörn) is a Volvo Ocean 60 yacht. She finished fourth in the W60 class of the 1993–94 Whitbread Round the World Race skippered by Brad Butterworth.

Route

Results 

Fortuna broke its mast twice in the first 24 hours of the race, and ended up retiring.

References

The Ocean Race
Punta del Este
Sports competitions in Southampton
Fremantle
History of Fort Lauderdale, Florida
Sports in Fort Lauderdale, Florida
Whitbread Round The World Race, 1993-94
Whitbread Round The World Race, 1993-94
Sports competitions in Auckland
1994 in New Zealand sport
1990s in Auckland
1990s in Southampton
Volvo Ocean Race yachts
Sailing yachts of the United States
Sailing yachts of Sweden
Volvo Ocean 60 yachts
1990s sailing yachts
Sailboat type designs by Bruce Farr